Ann O'Connell (born August 3, 1934), was an American politician who was a Republican member of the Nevada State Senate. She is the former owner and manager of Christian Supply Centers and Hotel.

References

1934 births
Living people
Nevada Republicans
Women in Nevada politics
21st-century American women